Beilschmiedia giorgii is a species of plant in the family Lauraceae. It is endemic to the Democratic Republic of the Congo.  It is threatened by habitat loss.

References

Flora of the Democratic Republic of the Congo
giorgii
Vulnerable plants
Taxonomy articles created by Polbot